Alan Steven Rudolph (born December 18, 1943) is an American film director and screenwriter.

Early life
Rudolph was born in Los Angeles, California, the son of Oscar Rudolph (1911–1991), a television director and actor, and his wife.

He became interested in film and was a protégé of director Robert Altman. Rudolph worked as an assistant director on Altman's film adaptation of Raymond Chandler's The Long Goodbye and later on Nashville.

Career
Rudolph's films focus upon isolated and eccentric characters and their relationships, and frequently are ensemble pieces featuring prominent romanticism and fantasy. He has written almost all of his films. In addition, he has repeatedly worked with actors Keith Carradine and Geneviève Bujold, and composer Mark Isham (see list of film director and composer collaborations).

Director Rudolph came to prominence with Choose Me (1984), the story of the sexual relationships among a handful of lonely, but charming, people – an ex-prostitute bar owner (Lesley Ann Warren), an emotionally repressed radio talk show hostess (Bujold), and a disarmingly honest madman (Carradine). Trouble in Mind (1985) featured Kris Kristofferson as well as Bujold, Carradine and Divine, in a rare, out of female drag, performance. The film was entered into the 36th Berlin International Film Festival.

The Moderns (1988) is a fictional love story set in 1926 Paris among well-known American expatriates such as Ernest Hemingway and F. Scott Fitzgerald, whom the film's characters briefly encounter. Expatriate American artist (Carradine) re-ignites his love for his former wife (Linda Fiorentino), despite her marriage to a sinister, philistine art collector played by John Lone. 

In 1990, Rudolph wrote and directed the private eye love story Love at Large, filmed in Portland, Oregon.

After the thriller Mortal Thoughts (1991) starring Demi Moore, he directed Equinox (1992), with Matthew Modine playing a pair of separated twins.  His Mrs. Parker and the Vicious Circle (1994), was a biopic of Dorothy Parker, with Jennifer Jason Leigh in the title role. 

Breakfast of Champions (1999) was an adaptation of Kurt Vonnegut's metafictional novel, with Albert Finney as the wildly prolific but terminally under-appreciated writer Kilgore Trout. The film was entered into the 49th Berlin International Film Festival.

Rudolph has also turned to painting, and In April 2008, presented a solo show of his paintings at Gallery Fraga, Bainbridge Island, Washington. In 2017, he directed Ray Meets Helen, a love story between two quirky outsiders, depicted by veteran Rudolph actor Keith Carradine and Sondra Locke, in her final film.

Films as director
Premonition (1972)
Nightmare Circus (1974, as "Gerald Cormier")
Welcome to L.A. (1976, also writer)
Remember My Name (1978, also writer)
Roadie (1980, also story)
Endangered Species (1982)
Return Engagement (1983)
Choose Me (1984, also writer)
Songwriter (1984)
Trouble in Mind (1985, also writer)
Made in Heaven (1987)
The Moderns (1988, also writer)
Love at Large (1990, also writer)
Mortal Thoughts (1991)
Equinox (1992, also writer)
Mrs. Parker and the Vicious Circle (1994, also writer)
Afterglow (1997, also writer)
Breakfast of Champions (1999, also writer)
Trixie (2000, also writer)
Investigating Sex (2001, also writer)
The Secret Lives of Dentists (2002)
Ray Meets Helen (2017, also writer)

Recurring collaborators

References

External links
 
 

1943 births
American male screenwriters
Living people
Writers from Los Angeles
Film directors from Los Angeles
Screenwriters from California